Krian–Legundi–Bunder–Manyar Toll Road is a toll road that links Krian in Sidoarjo Regency with Manyar in Gresik Regency in East Java. The toll road is planned to be connected with Tuban–Gresik Toll Road at north and Surabaya–Mojokerto Toll Road at south. This toll road was designed to link industrial areas in Surabaya metropolitan area. The connectivity of KLBM Toll Road and Sumo Toll Road is expected to boost investment in Gresik Regency.

History
The construction of this toll road was started in 2017 and consists of 4 sections:
Section I, Krian-Kedamean
Section II, Kedamean-Boboh
Section III, Boboh-Bunder
Section IV, Bunder-Manyar
Sections I, II, and III which links Krian and Bunder along 29 kilometers were inaugurated by the Governor of East Java, Khofifah Indar Parawansa on November 28, 2020. While Section IV was planned to be built on 2021.

Exits

References

Toll roads in Indonesia
Sidoarjo Regency
Gresik Regency
Transport in East Java